"Reach for the Sky" is a song by punk band Social Distortion from their 2004 album Sex, Love and Rock 'n' Roll. It was the album's first single. "Reach for the Sky" was released to radio on August 31, 2004, and reached number 27 on the Modern Rock Tracks in November 2004.

Appearances
"Coefficient of Drag," the first episode of Season 7 of The Shield.
Midnight Club: Los Angeles
Used as walk-up music by former New York Yankees outfielder Raúl Ibañez.
Tony Hawk: Shred
The opening montage for the AST Dew Tour.
"Claim" (2008) by Matchstick Productions.
Used in a scene on Season 4, episode 7 "Jinx" in Smallville

References

Social Distortion songs
2004 songs
Songs written by Mike Ness
Rock ballads
Songs inspired by deaths